Vagrich (Vahrij) Hakobi (Akopovich) Bakhchanyan (May 23, 1938 in Kharkiv, Soviet Ukraine – November 12, 2009 in New York City, United States) was a Ukrainian graphic artist and designer of Armenian heritage. He was a Soviet nonconformist and Ukrainian underground artist, and conceptual writer and poet working in the Russian language.

Biography
He was born to an ethnic Armenian family in Kharkiv, Ukraine, where he grew up, studied and began painting. In the mid-1960s he moved to Moscow, where he worked at Literaturnaya Gazeta. In 1974 Bakhchanyan emigrated to United States, and lived in New York City, where he was active in the literary and art scene. There he collaborated with Russian and Soviet émigré writers Sergei Dovlatov, Alexander Genis, and Naum Sagalovsky, among others. He illustrated the last sixty-six journal covers of a leading democratic international Russian language magazine "Vremya i My", published by Viktor Perelman. He died on November 12, 2009 in New York City. According to Vagrich's last will, his ashes were scattered high in the Geghama mountains (Armenia), over a stone covered with ancient petroglyphs.

According to Alexander Genis, Bakhchanyan "possessed a keen sensitivity to the absurdities of the Soviet regime. By developing and experimenting with inventive artistic strategies, Bakhchanyan broadened the range of expressive possibilities for other nonconformist artists. Many of his puns became an intrinsic part of Soviet dissident culture."

Collections
Museum of Modern Art, New York, New York, United States
National Centre for Contemporary Art, Moscow, Russia
Museum of Actual Art ART4U, Moscow, Russia
Tretiakov Gallery, Moscow, Russia
Hermitage Museum, St. Petersburg, Russia
State Russian Museum, St. Petersburg, Russia
Yerevan Modern Art Museum, Yerevan, Armenia
Museum of National Arts of Ukraine, Kyiv, Ukraine
John Paul Getty Research Center and Museum, Los Angeles, United States
Jane Voorhees Zimmerli Art Museum, Norton and Nancy Dodge collection, Rutgers University, New Brunswick, New Jersey, USA
Bar-Gera Collection, Cologne, Germany
Paul and Berty Quaedvlieg Collection, private collection, Netherlands
Stella Art Foundation, Moscow, Russia
Markin Collection, Moscow, Russia

Books 
 1981 — «Автобиография сорокалетнего автора» (Autobiography of a Forty-Year-Old Author)
 1981 — Visual diary: 1/1/80 — 12/31/80
 1985 — «Демарш энтузиастов» (Démarche of Enthusiasts, co-authored by Sergei Dovlatov and Naum Sagalovsky)
 1986 — «Синьяк под глазом: пуантель-авивская поэма» (Signac under the Eye: Pointillaviv Poem)
 1986 — «Ни дня без строчки (годовой отчет)» (Nulla dies sine linea, Year's End Report)
 1986 — «Стихи разных лет» (Poems from Various Years)
 2003 — «Мух уйма: художества». (Eddy of Flies: Artricks, Yekaterinburg: У-Фактория (U-faktoria), 2003. 
 2006 - «Мух уйма (Художества). (Eddy of Flies: Artricks. Not by bread alone. (Menu-Collage), foreword by A. Genis. Yekaterinburg: У-Фактория (U-faktoria), 2006, 512 pages. 
 2005 — «"Вишневый ад" и другие пьесы» (Cherry Hell and other Plays), NLO, Moscow
 2010 — «Сочинения Вагрича Бахчаняна» (Essays by Vagrich Bakhchanyan), Publ. by G. Titov, Vologda, Russia
 2011 — «Записные книжки Вагрича Бахчаняна» (From Notebooks of Vagrich Bakhchanyan), NLO, Moscow

References

External links

Biography
Bakhchanyan at Paris-Art.com 
 Мух уйма//Вагрич Бахчанян
 Русский европеец Вагрич Бахчанян 
 Vagrich Bakhchanyan

1938 births
2009 deaths
Ethnic Armenian painters
Conceptual artists
Ukrainian artists
Soviet Armenians
Soviet caricaturists
Soviet emigrants to the United States
Soviet painters
20th-century Russian painters
Russian male painters
20th-century Russian male artists